Whale Lake is a lake in Cook County in what is known as the Arrowhead Region of northern Minnesota. It is within the Boundary Waters Canoe Area Wilderness of the Superior National Forest, at the base of Eagle Mountain, Minnesota's highest point. Two miles (3 km) from the nearest road, Whale Lake is only accessible via the Eagle Mountain Hiking Trail from the south, or the Brule Lake Trail from the northwest. It offers two campsites to hikers, one on the northern shore near the intersection of the two trails, and the other a few hundred yards away from the western shore.

Whale Lake has been known to contain Bluegill, Northern Pike,
 Yellow Perch, and more commonly, White Sucker fish.

External links

References

Protected areas of Cook County, Minnesota
Whale
Lakes of Cook County, Minnesota